The Party of Sicilians (PdS) was a regionalist and Christian-democratic political party in Sicily. It was the Sicilian regional section of the Movement for the Autonomies (MpA).

History
In August 2012 it was announced that the Sicilian section of the MpA would be renamed Party of Sicilians (PdS). Contextually, Raffaele Lombardo, MpA leader and incumbent President of Sicily, chose not to run again in the 2012 Sicilian regional election. The newly formed PdS supported Gianfranco Micciché for President, as part of a "Sicilianist" coalition comprising Micciché's Great South (GS), the Sicilian People's Movement (MPS) and the regional section of Future and Freedom (FLI). Micciché won 15.4% of the vote, while the PdS obtained 9.5% and ten regional deputies.

In 2017 Angelo Attaguile, the only member of PdS in the Chamber of Deputies, led a split from the party and became secretary of Us with Salvini (NcS), sister party of Lega Nord (LN) in southern Italy. Another split occurred in 2015 when Rino Piscitello, PdS secretary since 2013, launched Sicily Nation (SN), which would later merge into the Sicilian National Movement (MNS).

In the 2017 regional election the PdS/MpA formed teamed up with Francesco Saverio Romano's Cantiere Popolare (CP) under the banner of "Populars and Autonomists". The list won 7.1% of the vote, obtained six regional deputies and entered the regional government led by Nello Musumeci, the newly elected President of Sicily.

Electoral results

Sicilian Regional Assembly

Leadership
Secretary: Giovanni Pistorio (2012), Rino Piscitello (2012–2015)

References

External links

Political parties in Sicily
Sicilian nationalist parties
Christian democratic parties in Italy
Catholic political parties